Exhibit (part of the SIMILE Project) is a lightweight, structured-data publishing framework that allows developers to create web pages with support for sorting, filtering and rich visualizations. Oriented towards semantic web-type problems, Exhibit can be implemented by writing rich data out to HTML then configuring some CSS and JavaScript code.

Overview

Technically, Exhibit is a collection of JavaScript files to be included in a web page. When Exhibit pages are loaded by a browser, the JavaScript reads in one or more JSON data files and builds a local database in the memory of the machine running the browser. Data can then be filtered and sorted directly in the browser without having to re-query the server. The design of Exhibit is optimized for browsing faceted data.

The Exhibit code base is currently being developed by members of the SIMILE Project at MIT.

References

External links
Website of the Exhibit Widget
Exhibit Wiki
Official SIMILE Project website

Web development software
Semantic Web